Aqen was a rarely mentioned ancient Egyptian deity of the underworld. He is first mentioned in the famous Book of the Dead. There, he guided the sun god Ra as the "protector of Ra's celestial bark" by "bringing the shen-ring to his majesty". He was also described as the "mouth of the time", from which the gods and demons pulled the "rope of time", as described in the tomb of king Seti I.

See also 
 Kherty
 Charon
 Duat

References 

Egyptian death gods
Underworld gods
Egyptian underworld

Time and fate gods